The 1951 Green Bay Packers season was their 33rd season overall and their 31st season in the National Football League. The team finished with a 3–9 record under second-year coach Gene Ronzani for a fifth-place finish in the National Conference. The Packers lost the final seven games of the season.

The Packers played their Milwaukee home games in Wisconsin State Fair Park for the final time, a venue they had used since 1934. Marquette Stadium was used for one season in 1952 and the new County Stadium was the host venue from 1953 through 1994.

Offseason

NFL draft 

 Yellow indicates a future Pro Bowl selection

Regular season

Schedule 

Note: Intra-conference opponents are in bold text.

Standings

Roster

Awards, records, and honors

References 

 Sportsencyclopedia.com

Green Bay Packers seasons
Green Bay Packers
Green